Wilmot is a children's television sitcom in the United Kingdom, co-produced by Yorkshire Television and Granada Television in 1999–2000. It ran for two series with a total of 13 episodes, beginning with its pilot episode, "Wilmot and Spoons," which aired on 5 May 1999. It was cancelled in 2000.

The sitcom was created by scriptwriter Alex Shearer. The sitcom's main characters were the titular child Wilmot Tanner and his elder brother Terry. Wilmot, a boy living in a fantasy world, often found himself in scrapes.

Cast
Christian Cooke as Wilmot Tanner
Stefan Podolchuk as Terry Tanner
Heston Aniteye as Martin
Carole Copeland as Mrs Tanner
Stefan Escreet as Mr Tanner
Alan Rothwell as Mr Ronson
Katie Ferguson as Amber Watts
Katie Hodgson as Edith

References

1999 British television series debuts
2000 British television series endings
ITV children's television shows
ITV sitcoms
Television series by ITV Studios
English-language television shows
Television series by Yorkshire Television